In mathematics, tautological may refer to:

Logic:
 Tautological consequence

Geometry, where it is used as an alternative to canonical:
Tautological bundle
Tautological line bundle
Tautological one-form
 Tautology (grammar), unnecessary repetition, or more words than necessary, to say the same thing.

See also
 Tautology (disambiguation)
 List of tautological place names